Millhurst is an unincorporated community located within Manalapan Township in Monmouth County, New Jersey, United States. Route 33 and County Route 527 (Sweetmans Lane) pass through the center of Millhurst. Much of the area consists of businesses along the aforementioned arterial roads with the Millhurst Mill at the CR 527 crossing of Manalapan Brook. The mill is a former grist mill built in the 1700s, rebuilt in the 1800s as a more efficient mill, and turned into a family business by Bernard Hochberg in 1925.

References

Neighborhoods in Manalapan Township, New Jersey
Unincorporated communities in Monmouth County, New Jersey
Unincorporated communities in New Jersey